Phytoecia katarinae is a species of beetle in the family Cerambycidae. It was described by Holzschuh in 1974. It is known from Turkey.

References

Phytoecia
Beetles described in 1974